Valentino Khan (born February 15, 1987) is an American DJ and producer born and raised in Los Angeles. He is best known for releasing material through Diplo, Skrillex and Steve Aoki. His singles "Deep Down Low" and "Make Some Noise" peaked at number one and fifty respectively on the "Billboard Twitter Emerging Artists" chart.

Career

2012: Beginnings 
He started his career as a hip-hop producer making music for artists like T.I., 2 Chainz and B.o.B.

In 2012, some of his remixes were released officially. Most notably, his remix of Gent & Jawns' song "Holler" which was released through Diplo's record label Mad Decent. He collaborated with Will Bailey for a song, "Rukus" and produced B.o.B.'s single "Play For Keeps" from the album Strange Clouds. He also co-produced Major Lazer's 2013 single "Bubble Butt". Musically, he is trap-oriented.

2013: Homage 
On June 5, 2013, he released a song "Fahrenheit" for free as homage to old school electro.

2014: In Khan We Trust 
His debut extended play, In Khan We Trust was released on July 22, 2014, via Owsla, featuring its first single "Make Some Noise".

2015: "Deep Down Low" 
On April 20, 2015, Khan collaborated with Flosstradamus to release "MFU" as a single. On August 11, 2015, "Deep Down Low" was released as a single. It featured on OWSLA's Spring Compilation album and was described as a genre pioneer. The song was regarded the 'most popular song among DJs' in 2015 and was featured in Tomorrowland's 2015 compilation album titled The Secret Kingdom Of Melodia. Musically, the song incorporates elements of big room house and jungle terror and is often considered "hard house". A music video for the song was released. A remixes extended play of the song was released.

2016: "Tropicana" and "Slam Dunk" 
He collaborated with Wiwek to release the song "Tropicana". On July 29, 2016, he collaborated with Skrillex to release the song "Slam Dunk". It featured vocalist Kstylis. He recognized Rihanna and Sia as his preferred female collaboration choices. Both tracks were released on OWSLA.

2017: "Bullseye", "Pump" and "Gold"
On April 7, 2017, he later collaborated with Anna Lunoe and Wuki for the single "Bullseye" via Skrillex's record label OWSLA. On May 26, 2017, Khan released "Pump" as a single via Mad Decent and Ministry of Sound which gained widespread popularity due recurring ads on social media platforms of the game Mafia City that samples this track.  On October 20, 2017, Khan released "Gold" on OWSLA.

2021 
On August 21, 2021, Khan was the first DJ to perform at the WWE pay per view, SummerSlam

2022
Khan is also the first DJ to perform at the WWE premium live event WrestleMania 38.  He will perform on both nights, April 2-3.

Discography

Extended plays

Charted singles

Singles 
2021
 "Your Body" (with Nitti Gritti) [Spinnin' Records]

2020
 "Anything" (with Alison Wonderland) [Mad Decent]
 "Everybodysgonnawannadancewithme" (featuring Sophie Black) [Mad Decent]
 "Division" [Mad Decent]
 "Deathproof" [Mad Decent]
 "Obsession" (with Ship Wrek) [Mad Decent]

2019
 "Flip the Switch" (with Chris Lorenzo) [Mad Decent]
 "Better" (with Wuki featuring Roxanna) [Mad Decent]
 "JustYourSoul" (with Diplo) [Mad Decent]
 "Pony" [Mad Decent]
 "Novocaine" (with Kayzo) [Mad Decent]

2018
 "Feel Your Love" [Mad Decent] 
 "Lick It" [Spinnin` Records]

Remixes 
2012

 Bernard Herrmann – Psycho Theme (Valentino Khan Remix)

2013

 Gesaffelstein – "Control Movement" (Valentino Khan Remix)
 Skylar Grey – "C'Mon Let Me Ride" (Valentino Khan Remix)
 The Bloody Beetroots featuring Paul McCartney & Youth – "Out Of Sight" (Valentino Khan Remix)

2014
 Dog Blood – "Middle Finger Pt. 2" (Valentino Khan Remix)
 Skrillex – "Recess" (Valentino Khan Remix)
 M.I.A. – "YALA" (Bro Safari & Valentino Khan Remix)

2015
 Dillon Francis – "When We Were Young" (Valentino Khan Remix)
 Flosstradamus featuring Waka Flocka Flame and Elliphant – "TTU (Too Turnt Up)" (Valentino Khan Remix)
 Axwell & Ingrosso – "On My Way" (Valentino Khan Remix)
 Zeds Dead – "Hadouken" (Valentino Khan Remix)
 Yellow Claw – "Run Away" (Valentino Khan Remix)

2018
 Calvin Harris and Dua Lipa – "One Kiss" (Valentino Khan Remix)
 Diplo, French Montana and Lil Pump featuring Zhavia Ward – "Welcome to the Party" (Valentino Khan Remix)
 Alison Wonderland – "Good Enough" (Valentino Khan Remix)
 Sean Paul and David Guetta featuring Becky G – "Mad Love" (Valentino Khan Remix)
 RL Grime featuring Anna Lunoe – "Pressure" (Valentino Khan Remix)

2020
NCT 127 - "Kick It" (Valentino Khan Remix)
Lele Pons featuring Susan Diaz and Victor Cardenas - "Volar" (Valentino Khan Remix)
DJ Snake - "Trust Nobody" (Valentino Khan Remix)

2022
Dillon Francis feat. Aleyna Tilki - Real Love (Valentino Khan Remix)

Production credits

Music videos

References 

Living people
Future house musicians
Dubstep musicians
American DJs
American electronic musicians
People from Los Angeles
1987 births
Mad Decent artists
Owsla artists
Electronic dance music DJs